Kotłówka  is a village in the administrative district of Gmina Żelechów, within Garwolin County, Masovian Voivodeship, in east-central Poland.

The village has a population of 225.

References

Villages in Garwolin County